Territorial Revisionism and the Allies of Germany in the Second World War: Goals, Expectations, Practices (2012) is a collection of essays on the annexation of territory by the Allies of World War II edited by Marina Cattaruzza, Stefan Dyroff and Dieter Langewiesche. It received generally positive reviews.

References

2012 non-fiction books
Annexation
Essay anthologies
Berghahn Books books
Books about World War II